Ramsjö is a village in Ljusdal Municipality, Hälsingland, Gävleborg County, Sweden with about 306 inhabitants. (2004, Statistics Sweden).

References 

Populated places in Ljusdal Municipality
Hälsingland